The Church of Jesus Christ of Latter-day Saints in Ecuador refers to the Church of Jesus Christ of Latter-day Saints (LDS Church) and its members in Ecuador. The first missionaries arrived on October 31, 1965. Since then, the LDS Church in Ecuador has grown to more than 250,000 members in more than 300 congregations. Ecuador ranks as having the 5th most members of the LDS Church in South America and 9th worldwide

History

The first Mormon missionaries from the Andes Mission arrived in Quito, Ecuador in October 1965 was Elder Spencer W. Kimball, one of the Twelve Apostles of the Quorum. Elder Spencer W. Kimball of the Quorum of the Twelve Apostles believes that teaching descendants of ancient Andean Indians will serve the purpose of fulfilling God's promise to bring the Book of Mormon to the Lamanites. Over the next few years, Kimball visited Ecuador a few times for preaching gospel. The church established a strong presence in Quito, Guayaquil, and among indigenous Otavalans.

In January 1966, Missionaries held the very first sacrament meeting in Guayaquil and they arrived Otavalo in March 1966. Within weeks of their arrival, printed notices were surrounded among nearby Ibarra warning the local residents to avoid Latter-day Saints and a few other proselytizing sects. 

The inaugural branch meeting was held in March, attended by the missionaries and Manuel Macías Caseras in Otavalo. Within the year, the branch grew to more than 18 members. 

On August 1, 1999, the Guayaquil Ecuador Temple was dedicated by church president Gordon B. Hinckley. On April 3, 2016 a second temple was announced to be built in Quito.

Missions

Temples

See also

Religion in Ecuador

References

External links
 ComeUntoChrist.org Latter-day Saints Visitor site
 The Church of Jesus Christ of Latter-day Saints Official site
 Ecuador Facts & Statistics Newsroom